Weldon is an unincorporated community in Houston County, Texas. The estimated population is 131.  It lies on Farm to Market Road 230. Weldon is served by the Lovelady Independent School District.

USAAF TB-25C Plane Crash
On July 14, 1945, a USAAF North American TB-25C (trainer variant) suffering apparent engine trouble crashed one mile northwest of Weldon, killing 11 passengers and crew.  The airplane exploded into flames upon impact with the ground, scattering wreckage over an area of 400 yards.

Notable people
 M B Etheredge: Born in Weldon, was awarded the Texas Legislative Medal of Honor by the Texas Legislature for his actions during battle in World War II.

References

External links
 The Weldon Story by Ava Bush. June 1964.

Unincorporated communities in Houston County, Texas
Unincorporated communities in Texas